Habbie may refer to:

The Habbie stanza or standard Habbie, also known as the Burns stanza
Habbie Simpson, the Scottish piper from Kilbarchan whom the stanza is ultimately named after
Any inhabitant of Kilbarchan (informal usage)